The 2022 Mexican Open (also known as the Abierto Mexicano Telcel presentado por HSBC for sponsorship reasons) was a professional tennis tournament played on outdoor hard courts. It was the 29th edition of the men's Mexican Open, and part of the 2022 ATP Tour.  The tournament took place in Acapulco, Mexico between 21 and 26 February 2022, at the new venue Arena GNP Seguros.

Champions

Singles

  Rafael Nadal def.  Cameron Norrie 6–4, 6–4

Doubles

  Feliciano López /  Stefanos Tsitsipas def.  Marcelo Arévalo /  Jean-Julien Rojer, 7–5, 6–4

Points distribution and prize money

Points distribution 
The players would receive the following points:

Prize money 

*per team

Singles main-draw entrants

Seeds

1 Rankings as of February 14, 2022.

Other entrants 
The following players received wildcards into the main draw:
  Alex Hernández
  Feliciano López
  Fernando Verdasco

The following player received entry using a protected ranking into the singles main draw:
  Pablo Andújar

The following player received special exempt into the main draw:
  John Millman

The following players received entry from the qualifying draw:
  Daniel Altmaier
  Yoshihito Nishioka
  Oscar Otte
  J. J. Wolf

The following players received entry as lucky losers:
  Peter Gojowczyk
  Stefan Kozlov
  Denis Kudla

Withdrawals 
 Before the tournament
  Carlos Alcaraz → replaced by  Peter Gojowczyk
  Maxime Cressy → replaced by  Stefan Kozlov
  Reilly Opelka → replaced by  Denis Kudla
  Frances Tiafoe → replaced by  Adrian Mannarino
 During the tournament
  Alexander Zverev (defaulted for unsportsmanlike conduct in doubles match)

Retirements 
  Matteo Berrettini

Doubles main-draw entrants

Seeds 

1 Rankings as of February 14, 2022.

Other entrants 
The following pairs received wildcards into the doubles main draw:
  Hans Hach Verdugo /  John Isner
  Feliciano López /  Stefanos Tsitsipas

The following pair received entry from the qualifying draw:
  Luke Saville /  John-Patrick Smith

The following pairs received entry as lucky losers:
  Lloyd Glasspool /  Harri Heliövaara
  David Marrero /  Fernando Verdasco
  Miguel Ángel Reyes-Varela /  Max Schnur

The following pairs received entry as alternates:
  Elbert Barr /  Manuel Sánchez
  Peter Gojowczyk /  Oscar Otte

Withdrawals 
 Before the tournament
  Carlos Alcaraz /  Pablo Carreño Busta → replaced by  Lloyd Glasspool /  Harri Heliövaara
  Grigor Dimitrov /  Reilly Opelka → replaced by   Miguel Ángel Reyes-Varela /  Max Schnur
  Raven Klaasen /  Ben McLachlan → replaced by   Peter Gojowczyk /  Oscar Otte
  Dušan Lajović /  Franko Škugor → replaced by  Dušan Lajović /  Hugo Nys
  Cameron Norrie /   Tommy Paul → replaced by  Elbert Barr /  Manuel Sánchez

References

External links
 

2022 Abierto Mexicano Telcel
Abierto Mexicano Telcel
Mexican Open (tennis)
Abierto Mexicano Telcel
Abierto Mexicano Telcel